De La Salle High School may refer to:
 De La Salle College (Toronto) in Toronto, Ontario, Canada
 De La Salle High School (Concord, California)
 De La Salle Institute, Chicago, Illinois
 De La Salle High School (New Orleans, Louisiana)
 De La Salle Collegiate High School in Warren, Michigan
 DeLaSalle High School (Minneapolis, Minnesota)
 De La Salle North Catholic High School in Portland, Oregon

See also 
 De La Salle (disambiguation)
 De La Salle Academy (disambiguation)
 De La Salle School (disambiguation)
 La Salle (disambiguation)
 La Salle High School (disambiguation)
 La Salle University (disambiguation)
 Lasallian educational institutions